Score or scorer may refer to:

Test score, the result of an exam or test

Business
 Score Digital, now part of Bauer Radio
 Score Entertainment, a former American trading card design and manufacturing company
 Score Media, a former Canadian media company

Mathematics
Score (statistics), a quantity in statistics
Score (number), a quantity of twenty units
Raw score, an original datum that has not been transformed
Score test, a statistical test
Scorer's function, solutions to differential equations
Scoring rule, measuring the accuracy of probabilistic predictions
Standard score, a quantity derived from the raw score
 Score, a period of 20 years

Science and technology
Single colour reflectometry (SCORE), an optical technique for monitoring biomolecular interactions

Arts, entertainment, and media 
Event score, written or printed instructions for a visual art performance

Films
 Score (1974 film), an American adult film
 Score (2016 film), a documentary
 Score: A Hockey Musical, a 2010 Canadian musical

Music
Score, a sheet music format in which simultaneous parts are vertically aligned
Score, a browser extension for rendering of musical scores
Film score, original music written to accompany a film
Piano–vocal score, a publishing format combining sung parts and a keyboard arrangement
Theatre score, the physical embodiment of theatre music, including lyrics
Video game music, also known as the game's score
SCORE (software), for creating and editing sheet music

Albums
 Score (Randy Brecker album), 1969
 Score (Paul Haslinger album), 1999
 Score (Carol Lloyd album), 1979
 Score (Duncan Mackay album), 1977
  Score (Fugees album), 1996
 Score (Dream Theater album), 2006
 Score (2Cellos album), 2017

Periodicals
 Score, a football comic which became Scorcher in 1971
 Score, a pornographic magazine by The Score Group

Television
 Score (talk show), or SCORE, a Pakistani sports talk show

Sports and games
Score (game), a number of points achieved in a game
Score (sport), a number of points achieved in a sporting event
Baseball scoring, recording the events of a baseball game
Scoring (cricket)
Herb Score (1933–2008), baseball player

See also
Dance score (disambiguation)
Orchestration, musical scoring
Point (disambiguation)
SCORE (disambiguation)
Scores (disambiguation)
The Score (disambiguation)
Score following, the process of tracking the position in the score of a live music performance
Scoreboard, a large board for displaying the score in a game
Score bug, an on-screen TV graphic displayed during sports game broadcasts
Scorecard (disambiguation)
Score sheet, used to record a chess game in progress
Underscoring, background music in a film
Underscore, incidental music accompanying some other artistic work